Dheeraj Gurjar is an Indian politician, belonging to the Indian National Congress. He serves as an All India Congress Committee National Secretary,  Co-Incharge of the All India Congress Committee for Uttar Pradesh, Member of the Rajasthan Legislative Assembly 2013-2018 from the  Jahazpur (Assembly constituency) and Rajasthan Pradesh Congress Committee general secretary. He got appointed the Chairman Of State Seeds Corporation Of Rajasthan in February 2022.

References

External links
Dheeraj Gurjar Twitter Account

Indian National Congress politicians
Rajasthan MLAs 2013–2018
1978 births
Living people
Indian National Congress politicians from Rajasthan